Military Academy with That Tenth Avenue Gang is a 1950 American comedy drama film directed by D. Ross Lederman,
and starring Stanley Clements, Danny Welton, and Gene Collins.

Plot

Cast
Stanley Clements as Stash
Danny Welton as Danny
Gene Collins as Mac
Leon Tyler as Specs
James Millican as Maj. Tony Thomas
James Seay as Maj. Norcross
William Johnstone as Col. Jamison
John Hamilton as Judge Ralph Townsend

References

External links
 

1950 films
American comedy-drama films
1950s English-language films
American black-and-white films
Films directed by D. Ross Lederman
Columbia Pictures films
1950 comedy-drama films
1950s American films